Joe Gilbert is an American football coach for the Tampa Bay Buccaneers.

Playing career 
Gilbert was a standout athlete at Horseheads High School where he earned All-Twin-Tier honors  before attending Hamilton College in Clinton, New York. Gilbert was a three-time all-conference selection, and four-year starter on the offensive line. During senior season, became the first Hamilton player to earn First Team All-America honors.

Coaching career

Albany 
Gilbert began his career in coaching at the University at Albany. He worked l as a graduate assistant in 1987 and 1988 under Bob Ford.

Penn 
After Albany, Gilbert became the assistant offensive line and recruiting coordinator at the University of Pennsylvania for  1989 and 1990 under head coach Gary Steele.

Northeastern 
In 1991, Barry Gallup and the Huskies hired Gilbert as their offensive line coach and recruiting coordinator. He remained with the team for three seasons.

Maine 
After coaching at Northeastern, Gilbert was hired by Maine as the team's offensive line coach in 1994. After the 1995 season, he was given the additional title of offensive coordinator, in addition to his duties with the offensive line.

Mansfield 
In 2000, Gilbert had his first opportunity as a head coach at Mansfield. He only remained with the team for one season.

Toledo 
In 2001, Gilbert returned to coaching the offensive line this time at Toledo under coach Tom Amstutz. Gilbert left the team after the 2003 season.

UCF 
On February 6,2004 following his three-year run in Toledo, went to UCF. There he went on to coach the offensive line also for three years.

Return to Toledo 
In 2007, Gilbert returned to Toledo as the team's tight ends coach. However he only remained there for a single season.

Houston 

Gilbert spent the 2008 season at the University of Houston, where he led an offensive line that helped the team rank second in the nation in passing and total offense and 10th in scoring offense.

Illinois 
In 2009, Gilbert was hired by Ron Zook as the Illini's offensive line coach. In 2010, he added the title of assistant head coach.

Colts 
He had a six-year stint with the Indianapolis Colts. First named an assistant offensive line coach in 2012, he held the title of offensive line coach from 2013 to 2015, and reverted to the assistant line coach in 2016 and 2017.

Arizona 

Gilbert coached the offensive line at the University of Arizona in 2018, while also having the title of run game coordinator.

Buccaneers 
In 2019 Gilbert returned to the NFL becoming the Bucs offensive line coach. Gilbert earned his first Super Bowl title when the Buccaneers won Super Bowl LV.

Personal life 
Joe and his wife, Cheryl, have one daughter, Madison, and three sons, Nicholas, Joseph and Timothy.

References 

Indianapolis Colts coaches
People from Horseheads, New York
Albany Great Danes football coaches
Tampa Bay Buccaneers coaches
Penn Quakers football coaches
Northeastern Huskies football coaches
Maine Black Bears football coaches
Toledo Rockets football coaches
UCF Knights football coaches
Houston Cougars football coaches
Arizona Wildcats football coaches
Horseheads High School alumni
Living people
Year of birth missing (living people)